The GPT Group is a Real Estate Investment Trust (also known as an Australian Stock Exchange listed stapled entity). The Group has been publicly listed in Australia since April 1971 and is one of Australia's largest diversified listed property groups.

It was managed by Lendlease Corporation until it was internalised in 2005. It continues to have a few properties managed and co-owned by Lendlease.

GPT focuses on active ownership of Australian real estate in a portfolio valued at more than $20 billion that includes retail, office, logistics, and business park assets. This focus is complemented by Funds Management and selective development.

In February 2021, the company signed an $800 million 50:50 joint venture with an industrial focused Canadian fund manager, QuadReal Property Group.

Accolades 
GPT is consistently ranked as one of the world's best performing property and real estate companies in international sustainability benchmarks and awards. 

GPT is a leader on the Dow Jones Sustainability Index, having held the number one or two position for the last nine years. GPT in September 2015 confirmed it had achieved a 50% reduction in the emissions intensity of its operations compared to its 2005 baseline.

References

External links
GPT Group

Shopping center management firms
Real estate companies of Australia
Companies based in Sydney
Real estate investment trusts of Australia
Companies listed on the Australian Securities Exchange